Pie Town is an unincorporated community and census-designated place located along U.S. Highway 60 in Catron County, New Mexico, United States. As of the 2010 census, it had a population of 186. Pie Town's name comes from an early bakery that specialized in dried-apple pies; it was established by Clyde Norman in the early 1920s. Pie Town has been noted for its colorful place name. Pie Town is the location of a "Pie Festival" on the second Saturday of each September. Pie Town is located immediately north of the Gila National Forest and not very far west of the Plains of San Agustin, the location of the Very Large Array radio telescope, which is also located along U.S. 60. In addition, one of the ten large radio antennas that form the Very Long Baseline Array of the National Radio Astronomy Observatory can be seen from U.S. 60, just east of Pie Town.

Depictions in media
Pie Town and its people were photographed in 1940 by Russell Lee, a photographer for the Farm Security Administration of the U.S. government. Pie Town, Lee's photos, and the local restaurant the Daily Pie Cafe were the subject of an article in Smithsonian magazine in February 2005. In 2014, a feature-length documentary, Pie Lady of Pie Town, was produced. CBS News Sunday Morning aired a story about the town in 2015.

Education
The school district is Quemado Schools.

Tourism

For cyclists, equestrians, motorcyclists, and hikers, Pie Town provides a number of services, including lodging, supplies, and unique flavors of pie on request. In June 2007, three residents of Pie Town, Nita Larronde, Don Kearney, and Kathy Knapp, were awarded the Curry Trail Angel Award by the Adventure Cycling Association in recognition for their kindness and generosity.

The area of Pie Town is rich in relics of the Native Americans. Many Anasazi and Acoma pottery shards 
have been found in the area, along with grinding slicks, an ancient axe head, and petrified wood. Some fossilized bones have been found on the ground. The ruins of Native American communities, which consist of one to a few dozen structures, are found here.

The Pie Town Annual Pie Festival includes a pie-baking contest, games and races, music, food, and arts and crafts.

Gallery

See also
Dust Bowl

References

External links

Pie Town, New Mexico at New Mexico Tourism Department

Great Divide of North America
Census-designated places in Catron County, New Mexico
Census-designated places in New Mexico